Valerie French may refer to:

Valerie Violet French (1909–1997), English socialite 
Valerie French (actress) (1928–1990), English film, television and stage performer 
Valerie French (wrestling) (born 1962), American wrestling personality

Valerie French, a 1923 novel by Dornford Yates

See also
French (surname)